Gumshan may refer to:
Gold Mountain (Chinese name for part of North America)
Gomishan, a city in Iran